Lolium is a genus of tufted grasses in the bluegrass subfamily (Pooideae).  It is often called ryegrass, but this term is sometimes used to refer to grasses in other genera.

They are characterized by bunch-like growth habits.  Lolium is native to Europe, Asia and northern Africa, as well as being cultivated and naturalized in Australia, the Americas, and various oceanic islands. Ryegrasses are naturally diploid, with 2n=14, and are closely related to the fescues (Festuca).

Ryegrass should not be confused with rye, which is a grain crop.

Species
Species of Lolium include:
 Lolium arundinaceum (Schreb.) Darbysh. - Eurasia + North Africa from Portugal + Canary Islands to Himalayas + Xinjiang; naturalized in East Asia, Australia, North + South America, various islands
 Lolium canariense Steud. - Canary Islands ryegrass - Canary Islands, Cape Verde
 Lolium giganteum  Lam. - Eurasia from Ireland to China; Bioko
 Lolium hybridum Hausskn. - Assam, Bhutan - Intermediate ryegrass
 Lolium mazzettianum (E.B.Alexeev) Darbysh. - Sichuan, Yunnan
 Lolium multiflorum Lam. - Eurasia + North Africa from Portugal + Canary Islands to Himalayas; naturalized in East Asia, Australia, North + South America, various islands
 Lolium perenne L. - perennial ryegrass - Eurasia + North Africa from Azores to Kashmir; naturalized in East Asia, Australia, North + South America, various islands
 Lolium persicum Boiss. & Hohen. - Persian ryegrass or Persian darnel - from Socotra to China; naturalized in scattered locations in the United States + Canada
 Lolium pratense (Huds.) Darbysh. - Eurasia + North Africa from Iceland + Azores to Kashmir + Yakutia; naturalized in East Asia, Australia, North + South America, various islands
 Lolium remotum Schrank - Indian Subcontinent; sparingly naturalized in scattered locations in Europe + northern Asia
 Lolium rigidum Gaudin - stiff darnel, Wimmera ryegrass, annual ryegrass - Eurasia + North Africa from Portugal + Canary Islands to China; sparingly naturalized in scattered locations in Australia + Americas
 Lolium saxatile H.Scholz & S.Scholz - Canary Islands 
 Lolium temulentum L. - Darnel, poison darnel - Eurasia + North Africa from Portugal + Canary Islands to China; sparingly naturalized in scattered locations in Australia + Americas

 Formerly included
Several former Lolium species now regarded as part of other genera: Castellia, Enteropogon, × Festulolium, Hainardia, Lepturus, Melica, and Vulpia.

Cultivation and usesLolium contains some species which are important grasses for lawns, and as pasture and for grazing and hay for livestock, being a highly nutritious stock feed. Ryegrasses are also used in soil erosion control programs. It is the principal grazing grass in New Zealand where some 10 million kilograms of certified seed are produced every year. There is a  large range of cultivars.  The primary species found worldwide and used both for lawns and as a forage crop is perennial ryegrass (Lolium perenne). Like many cool-season grasses of the Poaceae, it harbors a symbiotic fungal endophyte, either Epichloë or its close relative Neotyphodium, both of which are members of the fungal family Clavicipitaceae.

Some species, particularly L. temulentum, are weeds which can have a severe impact on the production of wheat and other crops. Annual ryegrass (L. rigidum) is one of the most serious and costly weeds of cropping systems in southern Australia, and herbicide resistance is a frequent problem. Ryegrass pollen is also one of the major causes of hay fever. Tennis courts, including those at the All England Lawn Tennis and Croquet Club, the venue for Wimbledon, are planted with ryegrass.
Glyphosate-resistant Lolium'' has been reported from Mississippi in 2006.

References

Pooideae
Poaceae genera
Taxa named by Carl Linnaeus